Biberi is a surname. Notable people with the surname include:

Ion Biberi (1904–1990), Romanian writer and literary critic
James Biberi (born 1965), Albanian-American actor